Lewis A. Rounds (7 June 1843 - 1 May 1916) was a Brevet Major of the United States Army who was awarded the Medal of Honor for gallantry during the American Civil War. Rounds was awarded the medal on 1 December 1864 for actions performed at the Battle of Spotsylvania Court House in May 1864.

Personal life 
Rounds was born on 7 June 1843 in Cattaraugus County, New York. He married Maria Allbaugh in 1865. He died in Milwaukee, Wisconsin on 1 May 1916 and was buried in Wood National Cemetery in Milwaukee.

Military service 
Rounds enlisted in the Army as a private at Norwalk, Ohio on 13 June 1861 and was assigned to Company D of the 8th Ohio Infantry. On 24 June 1864 he was transferred to Company B of the same unit. He was promoted to 1st lieutenant on 1 August 1864 before being transferred to Field & Staff on 6 September of the same year. He was then promoted to adjutant on 26 September 1864 before being transferred to Company C on 20 December 1864 as a captain. He was promoted to Brevet Major on 13 March 1865.

On 12 May 1864, at the Battle of Spotsylvania Court House, Rounds (still a private) captured an unspecified Confederate flag, which earned him the Medal of Honor. His medal citation reads:

Rounds was mustered out of the Army on 12 July 1865. His Medal of Honor is accredited to Ohio.

References 

1843 births
1916 deaths
People of New York (state) in the American Civil War
United States Army Medal of Honor recipients
Union Army officers
People from Cattaraugus County, New York
People of Ohio in the American Civil War